Carveout or carve-out may refer to:

 Divisional buyout
 Equity carve-out
 A specific exemption incorporated into a law.